The 1996 Leeds RLFC season was the club's the first season in the newly formed Super League. Coached by Dean Bell, the club competed in Super League I and finished in 10th place. The club also competed in the 1996 Challenge Cup, and were knocked out in the semi finals by Bradford Bulls. At the end of the season, the club changed its name to Leeds Rhinos.

Table

Squad
Statistics include appearances and points in the Super League and Challenge Cup.

Transfers

In

Out

References

External links
Official site: Rhinos Statistics
Leeds - Rugby League Project

Leeds Rhinos seasons
Leeds
Rugby